Veni Dona Dimitrova Sarbinska (born 28 December 1995) is a Bulgarian footballer who plays as a defender and the Bulgaria women's national team.

References

External links

1995 births
Living people
Women's association football defenders
Bulgarian women's footballers
Bulgaria women's international footballers
FC NSA Sofia players